2nd Kraków Grenadier Regiment was a scythemen regiment of the insurrection army during the Kościuszko Uprising in 1794.

History 
Both 1st and 2nd regiments were formed in 1794 after battle of Racławice out of all remaining scythemen who stayed with the insurrect army after the battle. Soldiers of the regiments wore rogatywka peaked caps, navy blue jackets with green revers and czechczery or white broadcloth-made trousers. The units were equipped with 300 rifles and never reached the planned number of soldiers or unitary look of the uniforms.

On 16 August 1794, Tadeusz Kościuszko, leader of the uprising, gave the regiment the red banner with They Feed and Defend (Polish: Żywią i Bronią, original spelling: Żywią y Bronią) motto on it. Nowadays the banner is associated as a symbol of the Kościuszko Uprising. Currently it is kept in Polish Army Museum, Warsaw.

Commanders 
Colonel Franciszek Bukowski
Colonel Ludwik Krupiński
Colonel Władysław Jabłonowski

Gallery

Notes

Bibliography 
 Rodowody pułków polskich i oddziałów równorzędnych od r. 1717 do r. 1831 by Bronisław Gembarzewski, published by Towarzystwo Wiedzy Wojskowej, Warsaw, 1925 (Polish)
 Wojsko Polskie Kościuszki w roku 1794, Bolesław Twardowski, published by Księgarnia Katolicka, Poznań, 1894 (Polish)
 Wielka Encyklopedia Polski, 10th volume, publiszed by Kluszczyński, Kraków, 2005,  (Polish)

Kraków Grenadier regiments